Le Train Michon was an  long secondary railway line from Don-Sainghin to Fromelles in the Weppes(fr) plain in northern France.

Route 
The standard-gauge branch line with a gauge of  ran in an S-shape from Don via Sainghin-en-Weppes, Fournes-en-Weppes, Herlies, Marquillies, Illies and Aubers to Fromelles. Its winding routing would not have been necessary due to the almost flat topography of the Weppes, but corresponded to the desire to serve several industrial plants existing at the time in order to maximise the volume of passenger and freight traffic. Around 1908, a connecting railway was laid to link the Marquillies sugar factory at Marquillies-Sud station.

History 
Mathieu Michon (1839-1923) founded the Cie des Chemins de Fer d'Interet local du Nord de la France on 8 September 1901 and was granted the concession to build and operate the line on 19 April 1902. The line was officially opened on 6 September 1906 and was mainly used for freight traffic, in particular to transport sugar beet, coal, building materials and beer barrels from the Motte Cordonnier brewery. The journey took about 40 to 45 minutes, sometimes over an hour.

During World War I, the line played an important role in transporting ammunition, supplies and building materials, as it was located immediately behind the front line in territory occupied by German forces. During the war, several standard and narrow gauge connecting lines were laid. The line was completely destroyed, but was rebuilt in sections in the post-war period from January 1920 and operated first by the Société générale des chemins de fer économiques (SE) later by the Chemins de fer du Nord and finally by the SNCF from 1938.

The Gombert boarding school in Fournes, a higher vocational school, used the railway on leaflets for its advertising. The pupils of the boarding school travelled from Fournes to Don on Sundays to get from there to Lille and back again in the evening.

Passenger services were discontinued in 1929. The line was closed in 1951.

Stations

External links 
 Le train Michon : une ligne secondaire dans les Weppes. (French Youtube-Video)

References 

Railway lines in Grand Est
600 mm gauge railways in France
standard gauge railways in France